Tiger Girl is a 2017 German drama film directed by Jakob Lass. It was screened in the Panorama section at the 67th Berlin International Film Festival.

Cast
 Ella Rumpf as Tiger
 Maria-Victoria Dragus as Vanilla
 Enno Trebs as Theo
 Orce Feldschau as Herr Feldschau
Franz Rogowski as Malte

References

External links
 

2017 films
2017 drama films
German drama films
2010s German-language films
2010s German films